Nils Oscar Brewery is a Swedish microbrewery, malthouse and spirits company that is based in Nyköping, Sweden. It was founded in Stockholm 1996 as Kungsholmens Kvartersbryggeri i Kungsholmen, Stockholm but changed name to Tärnö Bryggeri in 2006. 

Named after Nils Oscar, this establishment uses Oat, wheat, barley and rye to cultivate, malt, and brew beer and distilled spirits. It was the first Swedish craft brewery to launch a non-alcoholic beer in 2015.

External links
 Official web site

Notes

Companies based in Södermanland County
Breweries in Sweden